Tássio Maia dos Santos (born 8 October 1984), or simply Tássio, is a Brazilian footballer who plays as a forward.

Career
On 20 February 2011, Tássio joined for South Korean club Busan I'Park. Busan released him on 8 June 2011.

On 27 June 2012, Tássio joined Bulgarian club Lokomotiv Plovdiv. He scored on his Lokomotiv debut on 19 July 2012, scoring for the late equaliser in a 4–4 draw against Vitesse Arnhem in the Europa League. A week later, his contract was terminated by mutual consent.

On 27 July 2012, Tássio signed a contract with CSKA Sofia.

On 15 December 2012, his contract was terminated by mutual consent due to the sickness of his father.

In summer 2014, he transferred to the Chinese football club Wuhan Zall in the secondary league with a fee unknown. After playing nearly 10 matches without scoring a goal, he has been treated by the local fans as one of the worst transfers in the club history.

References

External links

Tássio at ZeroZero

1984 births
Living people
Footballers from Rio de Janeiro (city)
Brazilian footballers
Brazilian expatriate footballers
Associação Atlética Caldense players
Villa Rio Esporte Clube players
Chalkanoras Idaliou players
Associação Atlética Portuguesa (RJ) players
Volta Redonda FC players
Figueirense FC players
Busan IPark players
Anagennisi Epanomi F.C. players
Resende Futebol Clube players
PFC Lokomotiv Plovdiv players
PFC CSKA Sofia players
Boa Esporte Clube players
Ipatinga Futebol Clube players
Clube Atlético Bragantino players
Wuhan F.C. players
Botafogo de Futebol e Regatas players
Hatta Club players
Ajman Club players
Bangu Atlético Clube players
Deportivo Saprissa players
Madureira Esporte Clube players
Ferroviário Atlético Clube (CE) players
Campeonato Brasileiro Série B players
Campeonato Brasileiro Série C players
China League One players
K League 1 players
First Professional Football League (Bulgaria) players
Liga FPD players
UAE First Division League players
Association football forwards
Expatriate footballers in South Korea
Expatriate footballers in Cyprus
Expatriate footballers in Bulgaria
Expatriate footballers in China
Expatriate footballers in Costa Rica
Expatriate footballers in Greece
Expatriate footballers in Portugal
Expatriate footballers in the United Arab Emirates
Brazilian expatriate sportspeople in South Korea
Brazilian expatriate sportspeople in Cyprus
Brazilian expatriate sportspeople in Bulgaria
Brazilian expatriate sportspeople in China
Brazilian expatriate sportspeople in Costa Rica
Brazilian expatriate sportspeople in Greece
Brazilian expatriate sportspeople in Portugal
Brazilian expatriate sportspeople in the United Arab Emirates